Dieđut is a peer-reviewed academic journal published by the Nordic Sámi Institute (Guovdageaidnu, Norway). It features articles on social sciences, linguistics, and law. It was originally established to publish research findings from the Nordic Sámi Institute, but since 2005 has been affiliated with the Sámi University of Applied Sciences.

Dieđut (which translates from Northern Sámi into English as "information") began publishing in 1974, and prior to the establishment of the 1979 pan-Scandinavian Northern Sámi orthography the title was spelled Dieđot, using the Bergsland–Ruong orthography for Northern Sámi.

Some years the journal publishes only a single issue, but in other years it has published as many as seven. Issues contain both monographs and article collections. The journal also publishes a number of articles as open access via its website. The journal is classified as "Level 1" in the Norwegian Scientific Index and the Finnish  index.

The bulk of the articles are produced by employees of the Sámi University of Applied Sciences. Publication languages include Northern Sámi and other Sámi languages, as well as Norwegian, Swedish, Finnish, English, and Russian. Dieđut is the second-most common outlet for Sámi University scholars publishing in Northern Sámi.

References

External links

1974 establishments in Norway
Publications established in 1974
Sámi in Norway
Sámi magazines
Multilingual journals
English-language journals
Northern Sámi-language mass media